INRI is Psyclon Nine's second studio album, released on April 26, 2005, by Metropolis Records in the US and NoiTekk in Germany. INRI comes from the Latin phrase which, translated into English, means "Jesus the Nazarene, King of the Jews". The songs are of the dark, aggrotech genre focusing on religious themes. The album contains a cover of Ministry's "You Know What You Are". The original edition has an album cover depicting a topless devil woman, and was only sold in European stores. The US edition's cover is that of the band's logo and bloody wings lying below it.

Track listing
 "INRI" (Ner0, Eric Gottesman) – 6:11
 "Behind a Serrated Grin" (Ner0) – 4:51
 "The Feeding" (Ner0, Gottesman) – 4:09
 "Lamb of God" (Ner0, Gottesman, Josef Heresy) – 5:06
 "Hymn to the Angels' Descent" (Ner0, Gottesman) – 4:37
 "Rape This World" (Ner0, Heresy) – 4:34
 "The Feeble Mind" (Ner0, Gottesman) – 4:43
 "Requiem for the Christian Era" (Gottesman) – 3:16
 "Faith: Disease" (Ner0, Heresy, Gottesman) – 4:36
 "Harlot" (Ner0, Gottesman) – 5:05
 "The Unfortunate" (Ner0) – 2:50
 "Nothing Left" (Ner0, Gottesman) – 6:17
 "You Know What You Are" (Ministry) – 4:17 (Ministry cover)

Personnel
Nero Bellum – vocals, lyrics, guitar
Eric Gottesman – lyrics, bass
Josef Heresy – synthesizer
Marisa Lenhardt – vocals on "Requiem for the Christian Era"

Release history

Notes

Psyclon Nine albums
2005 albums